Richard J. Collins (July 20, 1914 – February 14, 2013) was an American producer, director and screenwriter prominent in Hollywood during the 1940s, 1950s and 1960s. He worked on several notable television programs including Bonanza, General Electric Theater, Matlock and Bob Hope Presents the Chrysler Theatre. He was married to actress Dorothy Comingore from 1939 until 1945. One of the characters in the film Guilty by Suspicion was based on his character although he and Dorothy Comingore were long divorced before the HUAC hearings.

Background
Richard J. Collins was born on July 20, 1914, in New York City. He attended various schools in New York, Los Angeles and Paris, including the Browning School, Lycee Janson de Sailly, and Beverly Hills High School. Collins also attended Stanford University for a term and a half before moving back to New York with his family. In 1936, Collins took classes for six months with the New Theatre League, where he joined the Young Communist League (YCL), the first of many left-wing associations he made over the years.

Career

In 1935, Collins returned to Los Angeles where he took a job at Bloomingdale's while looking for a way into the movie and television industry.  His' first position was as a script reader at Columbia Pictures, where he stayed for a few months before he was offered a junior writer position at Fox. During the 1930s, Collins would work for some of the biggest studios in Hollywood, including RKO Pictures, Universal Studios, Paramount Pictures, Metro-Goldwyn-Mayer and Warner Bros. He wrote or co-wrote many screenplays during this period, including some that would get him in trouble with HUAC in later years, like Song of Russia.

HUAC and the blacklist controversy
Collins had a successful film career up until the Hollywood 19 were called to testify before HUAC in October, 1947. At that time he agreed with the rest of the so-called unfriendly witnesses to plead the First Amendment Rights of free speech. Of the nineteen, only ten (the "Hollywood Ten") were called and it wasn't until 1951 that Collins was called to testify before HUAC.  By this time his politics had changed and he agreed to testify becoming one of the first "friendly witnesses."

Collins admitted to formerly being a member of the Communist Party USA (CPUSA), the Hollywood Anti-Nazi League, Hollywood Writers' Mobilization, the Joint Anti-Fascist Refugee Committee (JAFRC), and the Progressive Citizens of America (PCA). Despite his past, Collins claimed that he stopped paying his Communist dues in 1939. Collins became infamous for naming people he knew to be in the Communist Party, even close friends. In all, he ultimately named 26 of his colleagues. Despite being heavily involved in the Communist movement in the 1930s, when he attended four to five meetings a week, he professed that he no longer followed their doctrine and never saw anything he did as an effort to undermine the security of the United States.

Later career
After clearing his name in front of the HUAC, Collins was hired by Walter Wagner to write Haji Baba and then Riot in Cell Block 11, directed by Don Siegel. He wrote the treatment for the famous cult film Invasion of the Body Snatchers, which he said was based on his experience with the Communist Party and with HUAC. He also wrote screenplays for Pay or Die, Spanish Affair and The Badlanders. Later he wrote for television, including General Electric Theater, 87th Precinct, and Remington Steele. In 1963 he became a television producer for the TV series Breaking Point, followed by Bob Hope Presents the Chrysler Theater. His big break came when he became producer of the television series Bonanza. In 1976, he was the executive producer of the short-lived western series Sara. The final major production that he worked on was the series Matlock in the 1980s.

Death
Collins died at the age of 98 on February 14, 2013. He is survived by his son Michael Collins and daughter Judith.

Works
Pre-Blacklist Screenplays:
 1939: Rulers of the Sea (and story) 
 1940: One Crowded Night
 1941: Lady Scarface (original screenplay) 
 1943: Thousands Cheer
 1944: Song of Russia

References

External sources
 
 Obituary – LA Times
Box 4, Folder 3, Richard Collins Papers, Ax 691, Special Collections & University Archives, University of Oregon Libraries, Eugene, Oregon.
Box 4, Folder 9, Richard Collins Papers, Ax 691, Special Collections & University Archives, University of Oregon Libraries, Eugene, Oregon.
Box 4, Folder 10, Richard Collins Papers, Ax 691, Special Collections & University Archives, University of Oregon Libraries, Eugene, Oregon.
Box 5, Folder 6, Richard Collins Papers, Ax 691, Special Collections & University Archives, 	University of Oregon Libraries, Eugene, Oregon.
Box 6, Folder 16, Richard Collins Papers, Ax 691, Special Collections & University Archives, University of Oregon Libraries, Eugene, Oregon.
Box 6, Folder 17, Richard Collins Papers, Ax 691, Special Collections & University Archives, University of Oregon Libraries, Eugene, Oregon.
Box 6, Folder 18, Richard Collins Papers, Ax 691, Special Collections & University Archives, University of Oregon Libraries, Eugene, Oregon.
"The Song of Russia". IMDB.com. July 12, 2011.
Brooks, Tim, and Earle Marsh. The Complete Directory to Prime Time Network and Cable TV Shows: 1946–Present. New York: Ballantine, 2007. 137.
Rosenzweig, Roy. "Exploring U.S. History | Regulating Television". Center for History and New Media. July 13, 2011.	
United States Congress. Communist Infiltration of Hollywood Motion-picture Industry : Hearing before the Committee on Un-American Activities, House of Representatives, Eighty-Second Congress, First Session, 82d Cong. (1951) (testimony of Richard Collins). Print.

1914 births
2013 deaths
Film producers from New York (state)
American male screenwriters
Writers from New York City
Film directors from New York City
Screenwriters from New York (state)
Browning School alumni
Beverly Hills High School alumni